Jacobo Borges (born 28 November 1931 in Caracas, Venezuela) is a contemporary, neo-figurative Latin- American artist. His curiosity for exploring different mediums made him a painter, drawer, film director, stage designer and plastic artist.  Known for his ever-evolving style, there is one constant principle that unites his work: "the search for the creation of space somewhere between dreams and reality where everything has happened, happens, and may happen."  His theoretical approach and unique, innovative technique has won him acclaim all over the world. He has had solo exhibitions in France, Germany, Austria, Mexico, Colombia, Brazil, Britain and the United States. Today, he is considered one of the most accomplished artist of Latin America. His oeuvre includes a rich body of paintings, a film directed in 1969, and a book The Great Mountain and Its Era, published in 1979. In 1982, a biography by Dore Ashton, called Jacobo Borges, was published in English and Spanish.

Personal life 
Jacobo Borges resides in New York City and Caracas, Venezuela. He has a wife, Diana and three children, a daughter named Ximena and two sons, one named Ezequiel and other Emiliano.

Biography

Early work
Early in his career, Jacobo Borges studied art at Escuela de Artes Plasticas y Aplicadas (School of Fine Arts) in Caracas from 1949 to 1951. His formal training was short-live, as he rebelled against the Academic style of teaching and was consequently expelled prior to graduation. This was his first and last attempt at an official education; however, it did not stop him from pursuing his career. That same year, Borges began to work at the Taller Libre de Arte (Free Art Workshop) in Caracas where he exhibited his first painting.  The next year, 1952, Borges traveled to Paris on the scholarship money that he received from Metro-Goldwyn-Mayer company. In Paris he began to experiment with bright, bold colors and flat shapes that resulted in the painting Fishing (1956).  This work exemplifies Borges’ style during the first decade of his career - with strong influences from the Fauvism and  Cubism movements. His use of a vibrant and diverse color palette is reminiscent of the Fauvists, while his fragmented composition and use of geometric forms fits into the traditional Cubist practice. The Cubist influence can be attributed to the two years that Borges had spent at the Escuela de Artes Plasticas y Aplicadas where emphasis was heavily placed on studying Cézanne and the Cubist movement. Living in Paris at the time he painted  Fishing, Borges refused to experiment with different "art-trends" that were popular in European modernism. Instead, he stayed connected with his Latin roots and produced work that was "reminiscent of the Latin American indigenists, who advocated the use of themes and motifs from Indian culture." Borges was therefore often considered a naïve painter among his peers. His first works still lacked a very distinct style for which he is known today.

Neofiguration

Upon returning to Venezuela in 1956, Borges began to develop a more neofigurative style. This was a sharp change from the prevalent Abstraction movement that tended to simplify and generalize content. Neofiguration evolved in response to Abstractionism by returning to the subjective elements of Expressionism and the use of figurative form.  For Borges this was a necessary stylistic change in order to express his discontent with the political and social conditions of his country.

After ten years of the dictatorial regime of Marcos Pérez Jiménez, in 1958 Romulo Betancourt, the leader of the Democratic Action Party, regained power as the president of Venezuela. Though some of his policies supported social reforms, he also completely rejected the Castroites, which upset the Left Wing. On the other hand, the bourgeois class that made up the Right Wing completely opposed any social changes. This period of political reform had fueled and inspired many of Borges’ works produced during the early to mid 1960s, who himself sided with the Left.  His politically charged art was further encouraged by the El Techo de la Ballena (The roof of the whale) movement, founded in 1961. This was a group of novelists, poets and artists, among them Jacobo Borges, that formed in response to the Venezuela's shift of power. Through their manifesto, Stripes on the Roof, and multiple art exhibitions, the group  demonstrated their discontent with the new government that was still aiding the bourgeoisie.

During his early neofigurative period, Borges introduced human figures in his paintings who represented the upper class, the bourgeoisie, political or military personnel, and prostitutes. The figures were greatly distorted through the use of heavy impasto layered with rapid and rough brushwork. This technique echoed the characteristics of the Mexican artist Jose Luis Cuevas and the Argentinian Otra Figuracion movement "along with their sources in de Kooning, Bacon, Goya, Rembrandt, Posada, Orozco, the CoBrA artists as well as Emil Nolde and James Ensor." Paintings produced during this period came to be his most renown works. Based on the Coronation of Napoleon by Jacques-Louis David, Borges produced a series of drawings and paintings, Characters from Napoleon's Coronation, that made a mockery of the bourgeoisie class, transforming the formal coronation scene into a "burlesque" with deformed figures.

Multimedia
One of the major turning points in Borges' career happened when he took a five-year break from painting (1966–1971) to explore the audio-visual media. His interest in voicing his political and social concerns led him to direct a multimedia project Imagen de Caracas (Image of Caracas). This was a collaboration between actors, writers, filmmakers and musicians who all sided on the issues of the political and social injustices in Venezuela and wanted to expose the audience, the people of Caracas, to the 400-year history of political and social inequalities that prevailed in their city. The production was a great spectacle that took two years (1966–1968) to complete. The idea was to engage the spectator in the performance, make him part of it in the hopes that through this interaction the audience will become aware of the social injustices that still prevailed in the democratic Venezuela. However, shortly after its opening the government forced the Image of Caracas production to close its doors, perhaps due to its negative projection of authority.

In 1969, Borges directed a 35-minute black-and-white film May 22.
In the recent years, though his primary medium is painting, Borges still utilizes the multimedia in his exhibitions. In July 1996 Borges held a solo show in Salzburg, Austria that was based on the story of Noah's Ark, in which Borges intensified his presentation of flood through the use of multimedia pieces.

Later work
The time taken away from painting and invested in the exploration of multimedia had deeply affected Borges. Upon his return to canvas in 1971, he acquired a distinct style that greatly reflected the influences of his experience with filmmaking and photography. From that point on, Borges’ work became concerned with creating and depicting "shifting frames to create a sense of shifting time", rather than his political ideologies. His work no longer overtly portrayed his discontent with political and social issues, instead he became interested in producing images that dealt with traditional and cultural themes such as First Communion and betrothals.  His inspiration and subjects for the paintings came from the old photographs that he had collected. Borges used the images from the photos transforming them into paintings. His interest in "portraying passage of time and the persistence of memory" led him to developing a style that became associated uniquely with him. Borges began using depth in his images by creating focal planes, selectively  blurring figures in his paintings while sharpening others. This focal blurring effect was intensified by his use of glaze instead of heavy impasto, creating works that evoked dream like state. Paintings such as Waiting for… (1972) and Nymphenburg (1974) exemplify his newly developed technique.  
At the same time, Borges' work began to show the influences of the old masters such as  Velázquez and Goya. The composition and the placement of the figures in the paintings was more premeditated, compare to his early neofiguration period.   El novio (The Groom) (1975) with its vertical construction of the  room, and Nymphenburg  with its situated figures both mirror  Velázquez's work, Las meninas (1656).

In most recent works, Borges is continuously drawn to portraying images of water and tree branches creating a meditative quality paintings.

Legacy
In 1995 the government of Venezuela named a museum after Jacobo Borges. The Jacobo Borges Museum is a state funded institution located in Catia, a suburb of Caracas,  Venezuela. Situated in one of the most poor neighborhoods, the museum's mission is to expose the residents to the importance of the arts. Various art classes are offered to the community in the hopes that art will help to improve their lives. For Borges, it's a personal triumph since Catia is his hometown and he himself overcame the poverty by pursuing the career in the arts.  The museum exhibits works by the international artists as well as the local.

Quote
 - Jacobo Borges

Selected works
Fishing – 1956, Aldemaro Romero, Caracas
Mural – 1956, Rodrigo Guerrero, Caracas
Saint Michel's nets – 1960, Galeria de Arte Nacional, Caracas
Without Shades – 1962, Estudio Actual, Caracas
The Scream – 1962, Moises Feldman, Caracas
Personages of Napoleon's coronation – 1963, Museo de Arte Contemporaneo de Caracas
Waiting Room – 1962, Galeria de arte Nacional, Caracas
The Crowning of Napoleon – 1963, Ana Avalos, Caracas
Humble Citizen – 1964, Museo de Arte Contemporaneo de Caracas
The Show Continues – 1964, Hans Neumann, Caracas
High Finances – 1965, Private Collection, New York
Nymphenburg – 1974, Mariano Otero, Caracas
Time goes by I – 1974, Galeria de Arte Nacional Caracas
Landscape in Three Tempos – 1977, Banco Central de Venezuela Caracas
Awakening – 1978, Embassy of Venezuela, Brazil
The Little Cup – 1981, Galeria de Arte Nacional, Caracas
The Real Mountain – 1981, Just. W Michelsen, New York
Animal and Destroyed Piano – 1984, CDS Gallery, New York
Just Two – 1985, CDS Gallery, New York

Selected exhibition history
1956 - Two solo exhibitions: Galeria Lauro, Caracas; Museo de Bellas Artes, Caracas
1957 - São Paulo Biennial, Brazil; Official Salon, Caracas
1958 – Venice Biennial; Brussels World's Fair; Official Salon, Caracas
1959 – Palacio de Bellas Artes, Mexico City; Official Salon, Caracas
1960 – Official Salon, Caracas; Museum of Fine Arts, Curaçao
1961 – Official Salon, Caracas
1962 – Official Salon, Caracas
1963 – Solo exhibition at Galeria G, Caracas; "Twenty two Venezuelan Painters", Chile, Uruguay, Peru; São Paulo Biennial, Brazil
1964 – "Guggenheim International", New York; Second Biennial in Córdoba, Argentina; Museo deArte Moderno in Bogotá, Colombia; Sixth Exhibition of Drawing and Etching at the Faculty of Architecture, Universidad Central  deVenezuela, Caracas; Anniversary of the "Techo de la Ballena", Caracas; Second Biennial, Córdoba;  Museo de Bellas Artes, Mexico City
1965–20 South  American Artists, Museo de Bellas Artes, Mexico; Armando Reveron Biennial, Museo de Bellas Artes, Caracas; Galeria del Techo, Caracas
1966 – Ciculo-Galeria, Mérida, Mexico
1968 – "Image of Caracas", Caracas
1972 – Estudio Actual, Caracas
1974 – Third Biennial of Latin American Etchings, San Juan, Puerto Rico
1975 – "Exhibition of Venezuelan Art" Havana, Cuba; Studio Actual, Caracas
1976 – Retrospective exhibition (48 paintings) Museo de Arte Moderno, Mexico City
1977 – "New Proposals", Casa Bello, Caracas; Basle International Fair, Switzerland; *"Today's art in Latin America" Instituto de Cultura Hispanica, Madrid
1978 – "From Jacobo Borges Studio Today", Galeria de Arte Nacional
1980 – "Collage in Venezuela" Estudio Actual, Caracas; "Investigation of the Image, *1680–1980" Galeria de Arte Nacional, Caracas
1981 – Estudio Actual, Caracas; Galeria de Arte Nacional, Caracas
1983 - First solo exhibition in US – CDS Gallery, New York
1985 - CDS Gallery, New York
1986 - "From Fishing...to the Mirror of Waters. 60 Works of Jacobo Borges", Museo de Monterrey, Mexico

Awards and honorable mentions
1957 - Honorable Mention at the São Paulo Biennial Exhibition, Brazil
1961 - National prize for drawing, Caracas
1962 - Puebla de Bolivar prize; Antonio Esteban Frias prize
1985 - Guggenheim Fellowship

References

External links
 https://web.archive.org/web/20110714131723/http://angelfloresjr.multiply.com/photos/album/225  Images from the project Imagen de Caracas
 

People from Caracas
Venezuelan artists
Venezuelan painters
1931 births
Living people
Venezuelan film directors
Venezuelan contemporary artists